Pablakhali Wildlife Sanctuary is a wildlife sanctuary at the northern end of the Kaptai reservoir in the Chittagong Hill Tracts region of Bangladesh. The western boundary of the sanctuary is formed by the Kassalong River.

Description
The climatic conditions are typically sub-tropical with a dry period from November to May. The sanctuary area is bounded on the southern side by steep rugged hills. The soil is clay in the valley and pale brown to yellow-red (acidic) loam on the hills. A dam at Kaptai was constructed as a part of Karnaphuli hydroelectric project resulting in submergence of a large portion of the sanctuary. Humidity is high throughout the year. The IUCN protected area category is II.

History
Two forest villages of 112 inhabitants were set up in 1950. More recently, a large population of Rohingya have settled inside the sanctuary.

Biodiversity
The sanctuary has a tropical evergreen and semi-evergreen type of forest. It is covered with dense shrubby vegetation with patches of dense forest and bamboos.

Flora
The forest type is mainly tropical evergreen in the valleys and areas adjoining the rivers and lakes. The tree species growing are mainly Civit (Swintonia floribunda), Garjan (Dipterocarpus turbinatus)., Tula tree (Pterygota alata), Quercus spp. and Castanopsis. The other forest type is tropical moist deciduous. The trees found in this forest type are mainly Dipterocarpus sps; Mangifera indica; Amoora lawii; Cinnamomum sps.; Syzygium cumini; Tetrameles nudiflora; Salmalia malabaricum and Albizia sps. Albizia. The trees are scattered and interspersed with extensive tracts of grassland.

Fauna
The Indian elephant (Elephas Maximus) is the major threatened species found in the sanctuary. They are mainly restricted to the southern part, where savannas and perennial water bodies support their populations. The other threatened species is Hoolock gibbon (Hylobates hoolock). More common species include Wild boar (Sus scrofa); Rhesus macaque (Macaca mulatta); Capped langur (Presbytis pileata); Dhole (Cuon alpinus); small cats; otters; Indian muntjac (Muntiacus muntjak) and Sambar (Cervus unicolor). About 123 species of birds have been reported from the sanctuary. Records describe the presence of Tiger, two species of Rhinoceros, Banteng and Gaur in the sanctuary area which have since disappeared.

Threats
Part of the sanctuary is allotted to the settlers from the plains. The major threats are encroachment for cultivation land, removal of forest produce, and tree cutting by local people. The construction of Kaptai dam has also resulted in loss of wildlife in the area.

See also

 List of protected areas of Bangladesh

References

National parks of Bangladesh
Forests of Bangladesh